Say cheese is an instruction used by photographers who want their subject to smile.

Say Cheese may refer to:

 "Say Cheese" (How I Met Your Mother), an episode of How I Met Your Mother
 Say Cheese (novel), English title of the 1983 novel Скажи изюм by Russian writer Vasily Aksyonov
"Say Cheese (Smile Please)", a song recorded by Fast Food Rockers in 2003
 Say Cheese (TV series), a 2018 Singaporean series
 "Say Cheese", a song recorded by Poppy from Eat (NXT Soundtrack) in 2021

See also
"Say Cheese, Please", a Roland and Rattfink animated short
Soy cheese